The ECAC Holiday Hockey Festival was an annual NCAA men's Division I ice hockey tournament held annually at Madison Square Garden in New York City around the Christmas and New Year holiday. The tournament began in the year the ECAC was founded and continued for fifteen years before dissolving after the 1976–77 season.

The tournament was the first mid-season event sponsored by ECAC Hockey and initially only invited four members of the conference to participate. As the competition grew and became more prestigious it was expanded to 6 teams for the 1964 iteration and, two years later, invited the first non-conference member to participate (Minnesota). The championship returned to a 4-team tournament in 1967. For the first 12 years the tournament was held before Christmas but began to wane in interest and was not held in 1973. After a year hiatus it returned, this time being played after the New Year. The change to January didn't seem to help matters and the Festival was permanently discontinued three years later.

Yearly results

Note: * denotes overtime

Team records

References

1961 establishments in New York City
1961 in sports in New York City
1977 disestablishments in New York (state)
1977 in sports in New York City
1960s in Manhattan
1970s in Manhattan
College ice hockey tournaments in the United States
Ice hockey in New York (state)
Madison Square Garden
Recurring sporting events established in 1961
Recurring sporting events disestablished in 1977
Sports competitions in New York City